Farkaševac is a municipality in Zagreb County, Croatia.

Symbols
The coat of arms of Farkaševac consists of gold coins on a tree stump, with a sapling and a maroon wolf next to it. The town's flag is green, with the coat of arms in the middle bordered in white.

Demographics

2011
According to the 2011 census, there are 1,937 inhabitants, in the following settlements:

 Bolč, population 457
 Brezine, population 193
 Donji Markovac, population 41
 Farkaševac, population 303
 Ivančani, population 195
 Kabal, population 162
 Mački, population 84
 Majur, population 112
 Praščevac, population 120
 Zvonik, population 87
 Žabnica, population 183

92% of the population are Croats.

1910

According to the Austro-Hungarian 1910 census, Municipality of Farkaševac had 3,304 inhabitants, which were ethnically and religiously declared as follows:

References

External links

Populated places in Zagreb County
Municipalities of Croatia